The KSVK 12.7 ( (Krupnokalibernaya Snayperskaya Vintovka Kovrovskaya)) or Degtyarev sniper rifle is a 12.7mm anti-materiel rifle developed in Russia for the purpose of counter sniping and penetrating thick walls, as well as light armored vehicles.

Development
The KSVK anti-material (or large caliber sniper) rifle was developed in the late 1990s by Degtyarev plant, based in Kovrov, Russia. It is based on the SVN-98 12.7mm experimental rifle.

Design
The KSVK is a bullpup-configured, bolt-action, magazine-fed rifle. It is equipped with a muzzle device which acts as a muzzle brake and a sound damper.

The KSVK is equipped with standard Russian side-mounted scope rail (dovetail), and can be fitted with variety of day and night scopes. Open iron sights are installed for backup or emergency purposes.

Variants
 SVN-98 (СВН-98)
 KSVK (КСВК)
 ASVK (АСВК, army Kovrov large-caliber sniper rifle) – adopted by Ministry of Defence of the Russian Federation under designation 6S8 "KORD" sniper complex (6С8 «Корд») in June 2013 and used by the Syrian Arab Army during the Syrian Civil War.
 SBT12M1, a Vietnamese design based on the Russian KSVK with several modifications to fit the local conditions. It is equipped with the also Vietnamese produced N12 optical sight with 10x magnification. Manufactured at Z111 and Z199 factories.
 ASVK-M Kord-M: Upgraded version

Conflicts
The KSVK 12.7 has been in the following conflicts:
Second Chechen War
Syrian Civil War
2022 Russian invasion of Ukraine

Users
: ASVK is currently used by units of the Southern, Eastern and Western Military Districts and Northern Fleet. Improved version ASVK-M Kord-M entered service in June 2018.
 Russian separatist forces in eastern Ukraine
: Used by forces loyal to the Syrian Government.
: ASVK-M Kord-M, captured from Russian forces during 2022 Russian invasion of Ukraine.
: SBT12M1, a domestically produced version, featuring modifications to suit local conditions made by Z111 Factory.

See also
List of Russian weaponry
List of bullpup firearms
List of sniper rifles
Barrett M95
Denel NTW-20
Istiglal Ist-14.5
OSV-96, the KSVK's service competitor
PTRD

References

External links

6S8 at the manufacturer's website
Modern Firearms: KSVK 12.7

12.7×108 mm sniper rifles
12.7×108 mm anti-materiel rifles
Bolt-action rifles of Russia
Bullpup rifles
Sniper rifles of Russia
Degtyarev Plant products
Military equipment introduced in the 1990s